Georg Wöhrle (born 11 March 1953 in Würzburg) is a German Classical philologist and medical historian.

Life 
In 1983 he received his doctorate in Greek from Wolfgang Kullmann for his thesis on "Theophrasts Methode in seinen botanischen Schriften" (Theophrastus' Methods in his Botanical Writings). In 1988 he achieved his habilitation from the University of Bamberg with his work, "Studien zur Theorie der antiken Gesundheitslehre" (Studies on the Theory of Ancient Medical Education).

In 1994 he took up the position of ordinary professor of classical philology at the University of Trier, with a special focus on Greek. From 2002-2004, he was vice-president for research, teaching and external affairs at Trier.

Wöhrle is a liaison lecturer of the Friedrich Naumann Foundation, a committee member of the scholarship foundation of Rheinland-Pfalz and a contributor to the Frankfurter Allgemeine Zeitung.

Research focus 
Wöhrle focuses on archaic Greek literature, pre-socratic philosophy, gender studies and especially the history of medicine and natural science in antiquity.

External links
 
Georg Wöhrle on the website of the University of Trier

German classical philologists
German medical historians
1953 births
Living people